A balanced sentence is a sentence that employs parallel structures of approximately the same length and importance.

Examples
"It was the best of times, it was the worst of times..." (A Tale of Two Cities)
"White chickens lay white eggs, and brown chickens lay brown eggs; so if white cows give white milk, do brown cows give chocolate milk?"
From Abraham Lincoln's 1863 Gettysburg Address, two powerful examples:  "But in a larger sense, we cannot dedicate—we cannot consecrate—we cannot hallow—this ground." and "...that government of the people, by the people, for the people, shall not perish from the earth."

References

See also
 Parallelism (grammar)
 Parallelism (rhetoric)
 Sentence clause structure

Grammar
Style (fiction)
Narratology
Writing